Vidar Bahus, born 5 June 1965, is a retired Norwegian football goalkeeper who spent his career in SK Brann and Fyllingen Fotball. He played a total of 115 games in the Norwegian Premier League for those clubs from 1990 to 1999.

Outside football Bahus has worked as a bus driver. He is married and has two children.

References

Norwegian footballers
SK Brann players
Fyllingen Fotball players
1965 births
Living people
People from Os, Hordaland
Eliteserien players
Association football goalkeepers
Sportspeople from Vestland